The 2011 West Coast Fever season was the fourth season that the West Coast Fever contested the ANZ Championship, and the fifteenth year of the franchise's competitive history. In 2011, the Fever were coached by Jane Searle, in her third year as head coach. The 2011 season saw little change in the team's struggling history in the ANZ Championship, finishing in ninth place.

Players

2011 team

Transfers

Regular season

Fixtures and results
Notes
 Colours:   
 Home teams are listed left, away teams right. Times listed are local.

Standings

Final placing
 9th (3 wins, 10 losses)

Statistics
 As of Monday 2 May.

See also
 2011 ANZ Championship season

References

 ANZ Championship team page: West Coast Fever

West Coast Fever seasons
West Coast Fever